Acacia aneura var. pilbarana is a perennial shrub native to Western Australia.

See also
 List of Acacia species

References

aneura var. pilbarana
pilb
Endemic flora of Western Australia
Fabales of Australia
Acacias of Western Australia
Taxa named by Leslie Pedley